Local elections were held in Biñan on May 13, 2013, within the Philippine general election. The voters elected for the elective local posts in the city: the mayor, vice mayor, and ten councilors.

Overview
Incumbent Mayor Marlyn "Len-Len" Alonte-Naguiat decided to run as a re-electionist under the Liberal Party, her opponents are Reynaldo Cardeño, NPC's nominee and Joaquin Borja an independent candidate.

Mayor Marlyn's running mate is Walfredo Dimaguila, Jr. also under the Liberal Party.

Results
The candidates for mayor and vice mayor with the highest number of votes wins the seat; they are voted separately, therefore, they may be of different parties when elected.

Mayoral and vice mayoral elections

City Council

Voters will elect ten (10) councilors to comprise the City Council or the Sangguniang Panlungsod. Candidates are voted separately so there are chances where winning candidates will have unequal number of votes and may come from different political parties. The ten candidates with the highest number of votes win the seats.

 
 
 
 
 
 
 
 
 
 
|-
|bgcolor=black colspan=5|

External links
Official website of the Commission on Elections
 Official website of National Movement for Free Elections (NAMFREL)
Official website of the Parish Pastoral Council for Responsible Voting (PPCRV)

2013 Philippine local elections
Elections in Biñan
2013 elections in Calabarzon